Nicolas Industrie S.A.S. is a French manufacturer of heavy trucks, trailers, HMT and SPMTs, mostly intended for oversize loads. Nicolas has

been located in Champs-sur-Yonne since 1969, which is also when they started to develop vehicles meant particularly for very heavy loads. Their trucks, sold under the Tractomas brand, are built to single order. They most often incorporate Renault cabs and other

parts, as well as a number of proprietary parts from manufacturers around the world. The Nicolas Tractomas TR1010 D100 currently holds the record as the world's largest road going truck, weighing in at 71 tonnes.

History
Founded in 1855 as a manufacturer of agricultural trailers, Nicolas has been part of Transporter Industry International GmbH (TII) since 1994. TII also owns Scheuerle, KAMAG and Tiiger, other important names in extremely heavy transports.

References

External links
 corporate website

Truck manufacturers of France
Yonne
French brands